Tampa Bay Elite was an American women's soccer team, founded in 2005. The team was a member of the Women's Premier Soccer League, the third tier of women's soccer in the United States and Canada, until 2007, when the team left the league and the franchise was terminated.

Year-by-year

Honors
 WPSL Southern Conference Champions 2007
 WPSL Southern South Division Champions 2007
 WPSL Southern South Division Champions 2006

References

External links
 Official web site of the Tampa Bay Elite

2005 establishments in Florida
2007 disestablishments in Florida
Soccer clubs in Florida
Elite
Association football clubs disestablished in 2007
Association football clubs established in 2005
Women's Premier Soccer League teams
Women's soccer clubs in the United States